KCLR-FM (99.3 MHz), branded as Clear 99, is a radio station broadcasting a country music format. Licensed to Boonville, Missouri, the station serves the Columbia, Missouri area. The station is currently owned by the Zimmer Radio Group of Mid-Missouri. Clear 99 has consistently ranked a strong number-one in the ratings for many years.

References

External links

FCC History Cards for KCLR-FM

CLR-FM
Boonville, Missouri
1974 establishments in Missouri
Radio stations established in 1974
Country radio stations in the United States